The Football League 2009–10 (called Coca-Cola Football League for sponsorship reasons), was the seventeenth season under its current league division format. It began in August 2009 and ended on 8 May 2010.

The Football League is contested through three divisions. The third division of these is League Two. The top three teams of League Two were automatically promoted to League One and they were joined by the winner of the League Two play-offs. The bottom two teams in the league were relegated to the highest 'non-league' division, Conference National.

Changes from last season

From League Two
Promoted to League One
 Brentford
 Exeter City
 Wycombe Wanderers
 Gillingham

Relegated to Conference National
 Chester City
 Luton Town

To League Two
Relegated from League One
 Northampton Town
 Crewe Alexandra
 Cheltenham Town
 Hereford United

Promoted from Conference National
 Burton Albion
 Torquay United

League table

Play-offs

First Leg

Second Leg

Rotherham United win 3–0 on aggregate.

Dagenham & Redbridge win 7–2 on aggregate.

Final

Dagenham & Redbridge are promoted to Football League One.

Results

Top scorers

Stadia and locations

Kits

References 

 
EFL League Two seasons
3
4
Eng